AIS may refer to:

Medicine
 Abbreviated Injury Scale, an anatomical-based coding system to classify and describe the severity of injuries
 Acute ischemic stroke, the thromboembolic type of stroke
 Androgen insensitivity syndrome, an intersex condition in which there is an inability of many cells in the affected genetic male to respond to androgenic hormones
 Athens Insomnia Scale, used to measure severity of insomnia

Organizations and companies
 Advanced Info Service, Thai 3G/4GLTE mobile phone operator
 Akademio Internacia de la Sciencoj San Marino (International Academy of Sciences San Marino, a scientific association
 AIS Airlines, Dutch airline
 Armée islamique du salut, military wing of the Islamic Salvation Front, a former political party in Algeria
 Asahi India Glass Limited, Indian manufacturing company
 Association for Information Systems, an international professional organization
 Australian Information Service, historical Australian government agency (1973–1986)
 Australian Institute of Sport, a division of the Australian Sports Commission
 Australian Iron & Steel
 Aviatsionnaya Ispitatelnaya Stantsiya, Russian World War I naval aviation station and aircraft company

Schools 
 Abu Dhabi International School in Abu Dhabi, United Arab Emirates
 Agnes Irwin School in Pennsylvania, U.S.
 American International School (disambiguation), several schools, some known as AIS
 Antonine International School, in Ajaltoun, Lebanon
 Antwerp International School, in Antwerp, Belgium
 Atlanta International School, Georgia, U.S.
 Australian International School (disambiguation), several schools, some known as AIS
 Almaty International School in Almaty, Kazakhstan

Software and technology
 Accounting information system, a system of collecting, storing and processing financial and accounting data
 Aeronautical Information Service, distributor of air navigation information
 Alarm indication signal in a telecommunications system
 Alarm indication signal line (AIS-L)
 Alarm indication signal path (AIS-P)
 Alternate Instruction Set, a second processor mode in Centaur/VIA C3 x86 CPUs
 Application Interface Specification, for high-availability application software
 Archival information system
 Artificial immune system, in artificial intelligence
 Artificial Intelligence System, a distributed computing project undertaken by Intelligence Realm, Inc.
 Automatic identification system, for tracking ships
 Automotive Industry Standards, vehicle technical specifications of India
 Automated information system, an assembly of computer hardware, software, firmware, or any combination of these, configured to accomplish specific information-handling operations

Others
 AIS, IATA code for Arorae Island Airport, Kiribati
 Ais people, a Native American tribe living on the Atlantic coast of Florida, U.S.
 Ais, an alternate spelling of Eyeish, a native American tribe in Texas, U.S. 
 American Indycar Series (1988–2005), a former American auto racing series